My People may refer to:

Music
 My People (Duke Ellington album), 1965
 My People (Joe Zawinul album), 1996
 My People (Soul People), an album by Freddie Roach, 1968
 "My People" (The Presets song), 2007
 "My People", a song by Webbie from the compilation album Trill Entertainment Presents: All or Nothing, 2010
 "My People", a song by Zeebra, 2007

Literature
 My People: Stories of the Peasantry of West Wales, a 1915 book by Caradoc Evans
 "My People", a 1923 poem by Langston Hughes
 My People, a 1968 book by Abba Eban

Other uses
 My People, a 2022 documentary film directed by Anna Rezan
 My People FC, a youth football club founded by T. B. Joshua

See also
 My Peoples, a 2000s cancelled Disney film
 Mi Gente (disambiguation)